Michael L. Fink is an American visual effects artist. He won an Academy Award for Best Visual Effects for the film The Golden Compass, and was nominated for another for Batman Returns.

Selected filmography 
 Batman Returns (1992; co-nominated with Craig Barron, John Bruno and Dennis Skotak)
 The Golden Compass (2007; co-won with Bill Westenhofer, Ben Morris and Trevor Wood)

References

External links 

Living people
Place of birth missing (living people)
Year of birth missing (living people)
Visual effects artists
Visual effects supervisors
Best Visual Effects Academy Award winners